
Year 67 BC was a year of the pre-Julian Roman calendar. At the time it was known as the Year of the Consulship of Piso and Glabrio (or, less frequently, year 687 Ab urbe condita). The denomination 67 BC for this year has been used since the early medieval period, when the Anno Domini calendar era became the prevalent method in Europe for naming years.

Events 
 By place 

 Roman Republic 
 Consuls: Manius Acilius Glabrio and Gaius Calpurnius Piso.
 During Pompey's war against the pirates, he raises a fleet of 500 warships and fights with great success.
 The lex Gabinia gives Pompey command of the Mediterranean and its coasts for 50 miles inland for three years. He defeats the pirates in three months and pacifies Cilicia.
 Pompey divides the Mediterranean into 13 zones – six in the West and seven in the East – to each of which he assigns a fleet under an admiral.
 Pompey offers the ex-pirates and their families clemency, he settles them in agricultural colonies in eastern Mediterranean lands.
 Pompey takes over the command of Lucius Lucullus in the war against Mithridates VI, and reaps the fruit of the latter's victories.
 Lex Acilia Calpurnia: permanent exclusion from office in cases of electoral corruption.
 Lex Roscia theatralis.

 Judea 
 Hyrcanus II becomes king of Judea, for first time (until 66 BC), upon the death of his mother, Salome Alexandra.

 Pontus 
 Mithridates VI invades Pontus and defeats a Roman army at the Battle of Zela.
 After his victory at Zela Mithridates started consolidating his power in Pontus; restoring his rule over his old kingdom.
 Lucullus returned to Pontus, but his troops refused to campaign for him any longer and he withdrew to Galatia.

 China 
 December – The army of the Han Dynasty Chinese commander Zheng Ji is victorious over the Xiongnu in the Battle of Jushi.

Births 
 Arsinoe IV of Egypt, daughter of Ptolemy XII (and probably Cleopatra V) (d. 41 BC)
 Sextus Pompey, Roman general and governor (d. 35 BC)

Deaths 
 Lucius Cornelius Sisenna, Roman general and historian (b. c. 120 BC)
 Salome Alexandra, queen of Judea (b. 139 BC)

References